Pumping Station: One is a non-profit hackerspace/makerspace in Chicago, Illinois.

About

The organization provides a workspace and social group for people interested in learning. Members are encouraged to share the knowledge they already possess and structured classes are very common.  A member is not necessarily a "hacker" in the computer sense — some members aren't computer experts — but rather "someone who makes something and modifies it and uses it in a way that wasn’t originally intended." Other members volunteer their professions to support the group, such as through legal support.

History

Pumping Station: One started as a loosely knit social group of like-minded individuals meeting regularly at local cafes. In April 2009, the lease was signed for 3354 N. Elston Ave. in the city of Chicago.

By the end of 2013, the organization has grown to over 270 members and in mid-June, moved to a new location at 3519 N. Elston Ave.

As of the end of 2016, membership had grown to 435. By this time, the shop had become very well equipped, including a large format CNC router, a 150 watt large format laser cutter, a vertical mill and lathe, as well as a number of 3d printers and other equipment.

As of January 1, 2018 there were 525 members.

Involvement in notable events

 In August 2010, Pumping Station: One took part in a hackerspace challenge sponsored by Scion. Their entry was a Tron-cycle-powered ice cream maker.
 Pumping Station: One member Jim Burke launched the Power Racing Series.  The first season in 2009 consisted of 6 cars, all backed by other Pumping Station: One members.  The second season in 2010 was hosted at the Maker Faire Detroit with competitors from several hackerspaces throughout the country.

Facilities

Facilities include:

 CNC — All computer controlled tools, ranging from 3D printers, to laser cutters, to CNC mills.
 Electronics/mechatronics lab — Where most electronics related things reside, such as meters, scopes, soldering equipment/supplies, and mixed electronics devices for hacking and parts salvaging.
 General area — Includes a lounge room, work table spaces in the shop, and a scanning electron microscope.
 Graphic Arts and Textiles — The sewing and fiber arts section of the space.  This contains equipment for sewing, weaving and other related activities.
 Hot Metals — A shop space for hot metals work, such as welding, grinding, and forging.
 Kitchen — The area for all things food and drink related. Beer Church, the brewing group, is mostly hosted here.
 Cold Metals — A shop space for cold metals works. Tools include mills, lathes, etc.
 Woodshop — A shop space for woodworking projects.  Tools include a SawStop table saw, router, jointer, and thickness planer.
 Small Metals — A shop space for making jewelry, and other small metal sculpture.

References

External links
Official Pumping Station: One website
Vimby video overview of Pumping Station: One

Hacker groups
Computer clubs
Hackerspaces